The Pakistan National Federation of Trade Unions (PNFTU) is a national trade union center in Pakistan. It is a member of the Pakistan Workers' Federation and is affiliated with the International Trade Union Confederation.

References

Trade unions in Pakistan
International Trade Union Confederation